Seine Hoheit – Genosse Prinz is an East German film. It was released in 1969.

Cast
 Rolf Ludwig: Kaspar Mai / Eitel Friedrich Prince of Hohenlohe-Liebenstein
 Regina Beyer: Angelika Engel
 Jutta Wachowiak: Princess Diana
 Ilse Voigt: Spreewald Emma
 Mathilde Danegger: Princess
 Klaus Piontek: Hennes
 Rolf Herricht: Bruno
 Wilhelm Gröhl: director
 Axel Triebel: Prince Ferdinand
 Peter Dommisch: Prince Heinrich
 Peter Biele: Count Schwipp
 Rudolf Ulrich: Sebastian
 Gerd E. Schäfer: museum director
 Herwart Grosse: council chief

External links
 

1969 films
East German films
1960s German-language films
Films directed by Werner W. Wallroth
1960s German films